"Night Time" is a song written and originally recorded by the Strangeloves in 1965. It was written by Bob Feldman, Jerry Goldstein and Richard Gottehrer, and is a track from their I Want Candy LP.

The song reached No. 30 on the U.S. Billboard Hot 100 chart and No. 21 on the Cash Box Top 100. It did not chart internationally except briefly in Australia.

Chart history

Cover versions
"Night Time" was covered by Dr. Feelgood on their 1978 album Private Practice, by Jayne County on her 1980 live album Rock 'n' Roll Resurrection, by The J. Geils Band on their 1980 album Love Stinks, by George Thorogood and the Destroyers on their 1980 album More George Thorogood and the Destroyers, and by Bauhaus in a 1983 BBC session, later released on the 1989 album Swing the Heartache: The BBC Sessions.

References

External links
 Lyrics of this song
 

1965 songs
1965 singles
Songs written by Jerry Goldstein (producer)
Songs written by Richard Gottehrer
Bang Records singles
The J. Geils Band songs
Songs written by Bob Feldman